Drumcase (Irish derived place name, Droim Catha meaning 'The Hill-Ridge of the Battle'.) is a townland in the civil parish of Kildallan, barony of Tullyhunco, County Cavan, Ireland. It is also called Drumrath (Irish derived place name, Droim Ráth meaning 'The Hill-Ridge of the Fort’).

Geography

Drumcase is bounded on the north by Cloncose, Glasstown and Gortnacleigh townlands, on the east by Drumerdannan townland, on the west by Gorteen (Gorteenagarry) townland and on the south by Clooneen townland. Its chief geographical features are Drumcase Hill which reaches a height of 302 feet, small streams and spring wells. Drumcase is traversed by minor public roads and rural lanes. The townland covers 84 acres.

Etymology

The 1609 Plantation of Ulster Map depicts the townland as Dromcagh. A government grant of 1610 spells the name as Dromragh. A 1629 Inquisition spells the name as Dromrath otherwise called Dromcha, Drumcache and Dromcache. The 1652 Commonwealth Survey spells the name as Dromkah.

History

From medieval times up to the early 1600s, the land belonged to the McKiernan Clan.

In the Plantation of Ulster King James VI and I by grant dated 23 July 1610 granted the Manor of Clonyn or Taghleagh, which included  one poll of Dromragh, to Sir Alexander Hamilton of Innerwick, Scotland. On 29 July 1611 Arthur Chichester, 1st Baron Chichester and others reported that - . An Inquisition held at Cavan on 10 June 1629 stated that the  poll of Dromrath otherwise called Dromcha contained five sub-divisions named Curardinpourt, Knockbeache, Coullan, Tawnahinfin and Largan. It also describes the boundaries of Drumcase as- .

The 1652 Commonwealth Survey states the owner was Sir Francis Hamilton and describes it as wasteland.

The 1790 Cavan Carvaghs list spells the townland name as Drumcase.

The 1825 Tithe Applotment Books list four tithepayers in the townland.

The Drumcase Valuation Office books are available for April 1838.

Griffith's Valuation of 1857 lists four landholders in the townland.

The landlord of Drumcase in the 19th century was Hugh Wallace.

Census

In the 1901 census of Ireland, there were five families listed in the townland.

In the 1911 census of Ireland, there were two families listed in the townland.

Antiquities

 A foot-bridge across a stream.

References

External links
 The IreAtlas Townland Data Base

Townlands of County Cavan